Ronald J. Torgalski is an American former college baseball and college basketball coach. He was most recently the head baseball coach for the University at Buffalo. During his nine seasons as coach of the Bulls, he has compiled an overall record of 182–296.

High school
For much of Torgalski's childhood, his father, Bob, was a coach and athletic director at Saint Francis High School in Athol Springs, New York. Between several different sports and schools, Bob's high school coaching career lasted for over 50 years. Torgalski played baseball, basketball and football at Nichols School in Buffalo. As a baseball player, he was variously named to the All-Catholic team, the All Niagara Frontier League team and Honorable Mention All-WNY. In his single season as a sophomore football player, he was named Honorable Mention All-Catholic.

In 1985, Torgalski and teammate Christian Laettner led Nichols to a New York state basketball title in Class C. Torgalski was named Most Valuable Player of the state tournament and Class C All-State. Torgalski graduated as the leading scorer in Nichols history (with 1,783 points) and was later inducted into the school's athletics hall of fame. In 1985 he was named to the All-WNY team by The Buffalo News alongside Clifford Robinson.

College
Torgalski went on to play both baseball and basketball in NCAA Division III at Hamilton College in Clinton, New York. He majored in psychology and was a member of Delta Upsilon. As a basketball player, Torgalski scored more than 1,000 points and finished his career with the third-most assists of any Division III player in history at that point. He also helped Hamilton to championships in the ECAC Men's Basketball Tournaments in 1986 and 1987. In 1989, he averaged 10.6 assists per game and was named to the All-ECAC first team.

After college, Torgalski played professional basketball in Sweden for two seasons with the Monstreas Club, averaging 22 points and 9 assists per game.

Coaching career

Basketball
In 1991, Torgalski returned to Hamilton College as an assistant basketball coach. He served on the coaching staff for four seasons and helped Hamilton to a number one national ranking in the final polls in the 1990–91 season and a championship in the 1992 ECAC Men's Basketball Tournament. After the 1993–94 season, Torgalski left Hamilton to join Tim Cohane's staff as an assistant at the Division I level with the University at Buffalo. Torgalski remained on the staff for six seasons.

Baseball
In 2000, Buffalo resurrected its baseball program in Division I with Bill Breene as head coach. That year, Torgalski left the basketball program and joined the staff as an assistant baseball coach. In 2003, while an assistant coach, he received a Master of Science degree in education from Canisius College. After six years as an assistant coach, Torgalski was named the head coach in 2006. In 2013, he was named the Mid-American Conference Coach of the Year. Torgalski was the head coach of the baseball team until 2017 when the university chose to discontinue the program. Although Buffalo's was the lowest-funded baseball program in its conference at the time of its shuttering, Torgalski and his staff had several players selected in the Major League Baseball draft during his tenure as head coach.

Personal life
Torgalski's brother, Randie, similarly coached two sports at the NCAA level. He served simultaneously as the head softball and men's basketball coach at Elmira College. Another brother, Rick, played baseball at Duke for four years and served as team captain.

Head coaching record

References

Living people
American expatriate basketball people in Sweden
American people of Polish descent
Baseball players from Buffalo, New York
Basketball players from Buffalo, New York
Buffalo Bulls baseball coaches
Buffalo Bulls men's basketball coaches
Canisius College alumni
Hamilton Continentals baseball coaches
Hamilton Continentals baseball players
Hamilton Continentals men's basketball players
Place of birth missing (living people)
Year of birth missing (living people)
American men's basketball players
Basketball coaches from New York (state)
Baseball coaches from New York (state)